Johann VIII may refer to:

 Johann Hugo von Orsbeck (1634–1711)
 John VIII, Count of Nassau-Siegen (1583–1638)